Sondor is a manufacturer of  Audio Video equipment located in Zollikon, Switzerland until 2017. 
Sondor was founded in 1952 by Willy Hungerbuehler. Sondor started as a manufacturer of 16 mm film and 35mm film  magnetic film equipment. They are noted as inventing the standard for bi-phase interlocking pulse signals to  sync  sound to film. Sondor added a film transport telecine to it line of film sound equipment. Sondor products are found in many in post-production studios for  record and playback and in movie theater for sound playback.  playback.

Sondor film transport telecines uses a spinning prism telecine, like the model NOVA and ALTRA. 

Some  Sound Film followers player-recorder are the: OMA E and BASIC.
SOUNDHOUSE is a product to add sound pick up to other telecines, like the Spirit DataCine.

The other major maker of sound followers is Magna Tech.
DAT recorders and Direct to disk recording have replaced much of the work done on separate film sound followers.

On December 9, 2016 Digital Film Technology (dft), completed the acquisition of Sondor. DFT is the maker of the Scanity film scanner. 

Current Sondor products:
Versa, telecine-scanner, optical sound scan: and Magnetic sound scan 
Resonances, optical soundtrack

See also 
Film Chain
Digital film
Digital cinema
Direct to Disk Recording
Hard disk recorder
Factors causing HDTV Blur.
Color grading and editing systems.
Cintel telecine equipment.
Color suite
Dolby
For means of putting video on film, see telerecording (UK) and kinescope (US).

References

 Post Magazine Arri partners with Sondor, September 11, 2010
Summertone on Sondor
Magna Tech 10036-3 Film Sound Follower Recorder Player
Magna Tech 10036-3 Film Sound Follower Recorder Player
Film into video: a guide to merging the technologies by Stuart Blake Jones, Richard H. Kallenberger, George D. Cvjetnicanin
vtoldboys.com History of Telecine at the BBC, 1993.

External links
Sondor web site
Digital Film Technology web site

Film production
Film and video technology
Television technology
Video hardware